There is no official title for the spouse of the president of Iran. The current spouse of the president of Iran is Jamileh Alamolhoda, wife of President Ebrahim Raisi, who has held the position since 3 August 2021.

List

See also

 List of presidents of Iran

References

Spouse
Iran